Netarhat Residential School is a school in Netarhat, India. The school has a record of producing toppers of the Bihar School Examination Board year after year. The students have dominated the Regional Mathematics Olympiad and National Talent Search Examination (NTSE) conducted by the National Council of Educational Research and Training (NCERT). Students participate in inter-house and inter-set competitions and inter-school competitions. Santosh Kumar Singh is the present principal of Netarhat Residential School.

History
Netarhat Residential School was established on 15 November 1954, after the independence of India for the people of state of Bihar. It was a dream of the first chief minister of Bihar, Shri Krishna Singh and his deputy chief minister and finance minister Anugrah Narayan Sinha to establish a centre of excellence. The educationist Frederick Gordon Pearce, Jagadish Chandra Mather and Sachidanand Sinha played a vital role in making the plans for the school (or Netarhat Vidyalaya). Pearce has received kudos from Rajendra Prasad, then the president of India for his works.

Alumni
The alumni association is known as NOBA – Netarhat Old boys Association. There are chapters of NOBA, and the members meet regularly. On 12–13 November 2016, the Ranchi Chapter of NOBA organised the Global NOBA Meet at Mayuri Auditorium, CMPDI Kanke Road, Ranchi to discuss possibilities of giving back to the school and society.

Ambience
The school is situated far away from the busy life of town, on the plateau of Chhotanagpur, in the state of Jharkhand in India.  The whole atmosphere is based on Gurukul – away from home, staying in Ashrams, simple and country-made dress based on the Gandhian philosophy. The school has produced citizens who are following the motto of school Atta Dipa Viharatha – be thy own light.

The guiding philosophy can be summarized by the following shloka in Sanskrit etched at the entrance of the main building of the school.
ना त्वहम् कामये राज्यम् ना स्वर्गम् ना पुनर्भवम् |
कामये दुःखतप्ताणाम् प्राणीणामार्त्ति नाशनाम् || 
(Oh Lord, I desire not kingdom nor the heavens nor even moksha. All I desire is to remove the suffering from the afflicted beings.)

The school song
The school song (हिंदी: विद्यालय गान) of Netarhat school
वन्दे! वन्दे हे सुन्दर मम सखा नेतरहाट सदा,
वन्दे हे सुन्दर मम सखा नेतरहाट।

धन्य महाप्रांगण यह विंध्य प्रकृति क्रीड़ा का;
वन मे वनपशुओं का विचरण स्वच्छन्द यहाँ;
विहगों से कंठ मिला गाते नवगान सदा,
वन्दे! वन्दे हे सुन्दर मम सखा नेतरहाट सदा।

उषा के साथ जगें,प्रतिदिन मंगलमय हो;
कार्य पूर्ण प्रतिपल हो,ज्ञान वृद्धि जनहित हो;
अंतरतर का मधुमय गाये संगीत सदा,
वन्दे! वन्दे हे सुन्दर मम सखा नेतरहाट सदा।

साधक हैं समता के, सत्य न्याय करुणा के 
हिन्द प्रेम संबल है, विश्व प्रेम साध्य बना 
जन जन में ज्योति जगे, सत चित्त आनंद सदा 
वन्दे! वन्दे हे सुन्दर मम सखा नेतरहाट सदा।

Location
Netarhat (23°28'48"N 84°16'11"E) is located at an elevation of 1250 meters and is renowned for spectacular sunrises, sunsets, waterfalls, and beautiful flora and fauna. The nearest major railway station and airport is Ranchi, which is 156 kilometers away. There are buses for Netarhat from Ranchi and Palamau.

Tourists from all over India and abroad visit Netarhat, whose name means Nature's Heart. However, the place may have got its name from 'Netur Haat' (which means a marketplace for bamboo in the local language). Apart from bamboo, the pine and sakhua trees add to the flora. The waterfalls Upper Ghaghri, Lower Ghaghri, Tahir, Boodhha Ghaagh and the Koel river are nearby.

Admission and curriculum
Admission to the school, which is run by the government of Jharkhand (since inception it was run by the government of Bihar until the separation of the states) is given on the basis of three stages of examination: descriptive and multiple-choice written tests, psychological tests and personal interview. Boys between 10 and 12 years of age who are living in the state can apply for admission on a prescribed form through Sub-divisional Education Officers. As many as 20,000+ students used to vie for 100 seats (60 till the year 1982) just before the separation of the state of Bihar. Seats are reserved for the students belonging to the scheduled castes, scheduled tribes and other classes as defined by the state government.

Students are provided education up to 10+2 level. The medium of instruction is English and the curriculum is based on the standards set by the Central Board of Secondary Education. For the students of first three years ( Class VII to IX) the school has developed its own curriculum with provision for compulsory training in Music, Fine Arts, Agriculture and Crafts. Computer studies have been introduced to the school.

Administration and staff
The school has now been given the autonomous status and been named as Netarhat Vidyalaya Samiti under the control of Ministry of HRD, Govt. of Jharkahnd. Ex officio chairman of the general body of the NVS is the Minister, HRD, Govt. of Jharkhand while at present Dr. K.K Nag, ex vice chancellor Ranchi University is the chairman of the executive committee. The principal is the member secretary of the executive committee. As it is a government institution, its entire administrative system is governed and controlled by government rules and regulations.

All the teachers who are Gazetted Government servants (Note: Appointed earlier to formation of Netarhat vidyalaya samiti 2012) have been entrusted academic and administrative control. The principal is overall controlling officer.

Teachers come from all over the country whose appointments are made on the recommendations of the Netarhat Vidyalaya Samiti. Some of them have also gone abroad for teaching and studies under sponsored programmes (Data missing). A few teachers of the past and present have been awarded by the president of India.

There are instructors for P.T., crafts and some of the science subjects.

Shri Charles James Nepier was the first principal of the school.
Principals till date:

Co-curricular activities
Games, sports and physical training form a part of the routine at the Netarhat School. The school has senior division Naval wing besides the three junior divisions of N.C.C.National Cadet Corps (India) – Army, Air and Naval. There are four Scout troops for junior boys and they can also opt for the Red Cross Society. Training in yoga and gymnastics is also imparted to the boys and girls. Athletics and cross-country competitions are held besides sports tournaments.

The school has facilities for playing games like football, hockey, volleyball, tennis, basketball, cricket, badminton, table tennis, kho kho, kabaddi, carrom, and chess. Annual tournaments are held for most of these games and students also participate in inter-school tournaments.

The school has facilities for hobbies like wood-work, metal-work, aeromodelling, claymodelling, gardening, photography, painting and rifle training. Dramas in Hindi and English, debates, elocution and antyakshri(अन्त्याक्षरी) competitions are held. Some students participated in the six-week-long camp held on the plateau by National School of Drama. The picturesque locale has also attracted the directors of movies including the Hindi movie Hip Hip Hurray

Educational tours are organised by the school.

Societies of students have been formed to prepare for events such as Independence Day, Republic Day, Annual Day, Gandhi Jayanti, Tulsi Jayanti, Saraswati Puja etc.

Library and laboratories
The school has a library of around forty thousand books. The open shelf system enables students to have access to the books of their choice. Almost all important dailies, weeklies and magazines including some foreign journals are available in the library.

Fees
Fees are charged according to the income of the guardians. Poor but meritorious students are imparted free education. Clothes, books and other necessary stuff are also provided by the school. Food and lodging are subsidised for every student.

Hostels
All the students live in hostels which are called Ashrams. Every Ashram is headed by an Ashramadhyaksha or housemaster who is a teacher. All the teachers are addressed as Shriman ji. The housemasters and their wives, who are called Mataji (Mother), live in the Ashrams and have their meals with the boarders. Meals are prepared under the supervision of Mataji.

Seniors are addressed with ji suffixed to their names which is common way of showing respect in India among the Hindi speaking population. This tradition continues even after the students pass out of the school.

The Ashram chores are done by the inmates. The boarders follow a routine with provisions for swadhyaya(self-study), rest, P.T., games and sports, daily chores, television, group activities etc. A senior student is appointed as a prefect for the Ashram, as well as a couple of other senior prefects.

The barbers, cobblers, tailors and washermen are available on campus and the cost is borne by the school itself. There is a sick-room with a full-time medical officer.

The students are not allowed to wear any clothes or accessories other than those provided by the school to ensure uniformity.

Hostels are grouped into seven sets or ashram – wargas for purpose of administration and competition.

Surroundings 
Netarhat plateau is an abode of a variety of flora and fauna thanks to its supportive climate and copious rain.  Pine martins, porcupines, leopards, monkeys, bears, civets, monitor lizards, wild pigs, scorpions, snakes and other species are found in and around Netarhat. Occasional spotting of elephants and tigers is also reported as Netarhat forest is very close to the Betla Tiger Sanctuary.

Some endangered species of Indian snakes can be found here, including pythons. Netarhat School's biology laboratory has a collection of live and preserved snake varieties that include cobras, pit vipers, tree snakes and pythons.

Apart from the bamboo clusters the place may have got its name from, tropical trees like mango, sal, neem, gulmohar, amaltas, mahua, etc. can be found here and even trees of cold climate like pine, silver fur, bottle brush, thuja are found. "Chilgoza" or the pine nut is type of an aromatic and nutritious dry fruit and is popular amongst students. The school has its own fruit orchard where pear, plum, guava, fig, and peach are grown. The flower garden has over 100 specious of common and exotic flowers.

Netarhat School is surrounded by villages and the locals find good employment opportunities in serving the school. There are over dozen communities, each with their customs and festivals. Students can often hear in the night distant drumming sounds of tribal dance and rituals and on festivals like Sarhul and Pooja the fair organized by the locals provides a break for the students from their academic sessions.

Netarhat plateau, also referred to as the Queen of Chotanagpur is studded by landmarks and tourist spots sduch as Koel view, Magnolia sunset point, Lodh waterfalls, and the Lower Ghagari waterfall. There are picnic spots in and around Netarhat School and group of students under supervision of their respective house masters(ashramadhyaksha) traditionally go to spend a weekend once in a year during the "mid-term break". Some of the most popular spots are Banari on the banks of the Koel river, Upper Gahgari waterfall near Netarhat dam, Tahir, Naina, Aadhe, and Raja Dera.

Shortcomings and issues 
These points are listed here to provide a balanced overview to a prospective student. In the initial 20–30 years, this school managed to do amazing to bring world class education in affordable way. This showed up in the glowing achievements of alumni who were praised all around for exceptional results in life. Over the time though, some systematic failures started appearing aided by various factors. Late 70s started the trend and early 90s saw the peak of these shortcomings. This also resulted in declining popularity of this institutions among the masses. Poorly performing alumni also contributed to the decline in popularity.

Decline in educational standards 
When this school was started, teachers were recruited from all over India based on merit, and they were given best salaries. After 1980, Bihar government started recruiting teachers from Bihar state only. Nowadays salaries are also not so high as earlier (as salary structure has been decreased). Good teachers stopped coming. The job nature just matched with low-grade private schools, which led to severe decline in standards and education quality.

School failed to keep up with times. Whatever system was put in place during initial years are no longer sufficient for the 21st century.

Government interfered to increase admission counts per year without updating the infrastructure or budget.

House masters are expected to have effective oversight on inmates, but they rarely come out to see the surroundings. A gurukul system entails teachers and students interacting for majority of the time during waking hours. The spirit has gone down drastically. Students from age group 10–14 are left to fend for themselves against seniors without effective supervision.

Abundance of coaching trained students 
Many coaching schools opened up in Beguserai, Lakhiserai and Patna to train students for admission to this school. Students were rigorously trained to clear these exams in extreme conditions. Records would be fudged up to show lower age considering that only students in a certain age group were allowed. Most of the students from these coaching institutions would do very good in entrance examination, but start faltering once in school. Many of them does not even get good jobs after long time. Some times, even allegations were aired about certain principals taking bribe to overlook over age and other tell tale signs of such rigging of the system.

Misuse of scholarship scheme 
Many students from well off rural families would claim to come from agriculture background with no significant incomes and thus avail of lowest fees structure. This leads to school being fully dependent on government grants.

High standard of facilities 
Medical facilities are nowadays above standard and a full-time doctor along with compounder resided at the campus.
The sports department is also fully equipped and the in charges are very dedicated towards their work. 
Library is grossly utilized and it is stocked with new as well as ancient books which is the distinctive feature of the school.
Arts & Music teachers are mostly above standard quality compared to original teachers.
Huge up lift is being done recent times, but still a lot needs to be done.
Food quality is a great feature of Netarhat School as the quality of raw materials procured by the school administration is extremely high.
Power situation has been improved, and the school is going to install three new large capacity generator sets as an alternative source.

Maoist problems 
Jungles around the school are now strong bastions of Maoist activities. They do not disturb the students or school, but movement of students and faculty is limited to the school campus only. Students go deep in jungle to see falls and enjoy nature.

References

External links
Official website
The Last Gurukul – A Documentary
Blog dedicated to Netarhat school
Netarhat Old boys Association website
List of Toppers from Netarhat School in Bihar Secondary School Examination
President Dr. Rajendra Prasad writes about Netarhat School to Mr. F. G. Pearce
Netarhat School completes 50 years: A report in the Times of India
Netarhat School toppers: The Telegraph
Netarhat: tourism information
 Decline in Tourism due to Naxalism
 Proposal to revive former glory of Netarhat School
 Declining name and revival plans of government about Netarhat

Educational institutions established in 1954
Schools in Jharkhand
Boys' schools in India
Boarding schools in Jharkhand
1954 establishments in Bihar